Kids on Q is a Philippine television children's show broadcast by Q. Hosted by Tonipet Gaba, it premiered on April 28, 2007. The show concluded on January 30, 2010 with a total of 135 episodes.

Overview
The show features 3-5 minute AVs (Audio and Video) on the latest news, issues, and concerns of children and their parents. The program aims to be an entertaining yet informative aid to answering the many questions a child has about his world. It is anchored by Tonipet Gaba, who also hosts Art Angel on GMA Network and Tara Lets Eat segment of The Beat (formerly Sapulso).

Reporters
Originally includes ten (10) talented and witty on-cam talents called Q reporters. For each episode, five (5) Q reporters rotate on reporting various segments and bumpers. Each Q reporter has his own 'specialty' story (food, fashion, culture, sports, behind the scenes of events and shows, adventure, etc.), but are not limited on tackling other topics.

Renford Alano
Aria Cariño
Isabella Dayto
Mikee de Vega
Caleb Gotico
Ella Guevara
Eugene Herrera
Nikki Liu
Sam Turingan

Graduated Q Reporter
David Hubalde
Romina de Jesus

Kids on Q Super Squad
On March 28, 2009, Kids on Q reintroduced their Q reporters as the Super Squad. Kuya Tonipet acts as the squad leader, and gives out their “missions” at the beginning of the show. The kids are given their own characters, moniker and costume which are related to their missions.

Renford Alano "Taste Buddy Renford"
Aria Cariño "Resident Foodie Aria"
Ish Dayto "Eco-Ish"
Mikee de Vega "Smarty Mikee"
Caleb Gotico "Cool Caleb"
Ella Guevara "Cheer-fella Ella"
Eugene Herrera "Eugene the Dream"
Nikki Liu "Nifty Nikki"
Sam Turingan "Jammin' Sam"

History
With the growing demand of new and quality station-produced programs on Q, its public affairs department launched Kids on Q. Its format is similar with its predecessors 5 and Up and Chikiting Patrol, but aims to feature a more complex and wider range of topics.

In early 2007, auditions were held at some selected schools in the metro and at the GMA Network Center for its line-up of kid correspondents. Those who passed the preliminary auditions were then exposed on-cam and trained through Q Channel 11's reality job search program "May Trabaho Ka!" (now called "Hired"). Nine hopefuls were chosen (Renford, Aria, Ish, Romina, Mikee, Caleb, David, Nikki and Sam) from the said reality show. StarStruck Kids finalist Ella Guevara who also auditioned as Kids on Q reporter was also chosen. Together they compose the original line-up of Q reporters. Tonipet Gaba, more popularly known as Kuya Tonipet was assigned as the show's anchor, whose task is to give the introduction to the kid's reports.

On April 28, 2007, Kids on Q's pilot episode aired. Originally, the show consists of six to seven main segments and three bumper segments. Six Q reporters rotate each week to deliver various stories ranging from food, fashion, sports, culture, animals, behind the scenes of events and concerts, and anything about kids. Three out of the six reporters will then have additional bumper reports or mini segments usually featuring additional information (Word for the Day, Kidstory, Special Q Report, Kidspeak, Fun Science, Math Made Easy, Inside out, etc.). During the show's continuous evolution, it trimmed down its segments from six to five, and bumpers from the original three to only one or two (mostly Special Q Reports, Paid Advertisements, and additional Brain Teasers trivia) depending on the occasion.

Also Q reporters are now assigned to a specific 'specialty' story, and usually has an attached moniker or gimmick that matches his/her personality. For example, Renford is now known as "The Taste Buddy" and is assigned mostly on food segments, while Romina is the "Resident Fashionista", and usually reports about kiddie fashion. Although they have 'specialty' stories, they are not limited to it and can still report on different topics depending on the situation. Also, tandems are added on the show. Nikki and Caleb are the only regular tandems on the show (but occasionally both can still report alone), but depending on situations, they could be paired with other reporters, or other reporters can become tandems. Another modification on the show includes two or more Q reporter appearing on one segment. This is common during their out-of-town shoots and specials like in Subic, Bataan, Baguio, Ilocos Sur, Pulilan and Zambales.

Another notable change in the show is its medium. In the early months of the show, it was delivered mostly in Filipino with a little English. But because Q-11's target audience is the Class A and B viewers, it moderately incorporated more English with the kid's reports. In early 2008, during the station's reformat to a more "Class A-B" look, Kids on Q's medium officially shifted. Tonipet's headlines and introductions and the whole Q reporter's segments are now delivered almost completely in English, with a little Filipino only on some of the kid's soundbytes and unavoidable local terms.

In summer of 2008, David bid farewell to the show, and another set of auditions were held at the GMA Network Center. This coincided with the show's first anniversary and as preparation for its relaunch. Unlike the first set of auditions, it was only exclusive for boys 7 – 12 years old to fill David's slot. In the second leg of the Kids on Q Sunday Funday Year 2 in SM Sucat, the newest Q Reporter was introduced to the staff, crew and those who were luckily present during the said event. It was none other than Eugene Herrera who passed the auditions. Despite Eugene's prior public appearance on the second (SM Sucat) and fourth (Eastwood) Sunday Funday, his debut appearance on the show was set on the relaunch episode of KOQ!.

With a new reporter and a lot of changes during its first year, Kids on Q needed a new look and Opening Billboard (OBB) for its scheduled relaunch and upcoming second year. The OBB shoot was set on June 4, 2008 in the theme park Enchanted Kingdom . All ten Q reporters were present during the shoot. KOQ! team leader Kuya Tonipet also directed the new OBB. It first aired on Kids on Q's Relaunch on June 21, 2008.

In January 2009, the show trimmed its segments from six (6) to only four (4), with additional shorties or bumpers to complete an episode.

On the February 28, 2009 episode of Kids on Q, the show’s Resident Fashionista, Romina graduated as a Q reporter. This left the show with only nine (9) Q reporters.

Meanwhile, on March 28 the same year, the show had its 2nd relaunch, reintroducing the remaining Q reporters as the Kids on Q Super Squad. The Squad Members are now assigned with different characters, moniker and costume which are related to the missions assigned to them (although this is not always the case, they can still do other stories not related to their characters). No less than Kuya Tonipet serves as the squad leader and gives out the missions to the squad members. As part of the reformat, they also introduced a new character, Webbie, the resident cyber guide. The character is voiced by squad member Eugene and has his own bumper segment called Webbie’s World.

Kids on Q bid farewell last January 30, 2010 with a special feature on Quezon province and a farewell segment at the end of the episode, which featured the Kids on Q Super Squad's experiences and memories on the show. The show ran for 2 years and 9 months.

Accolades
Anak TV Seal Award
 2008 Award
 2009 Award

PMPC Star Awards for Television
 2007-2009 Nominated, Best Children's Show & Hosts

Taiwan International Children's Film Festival
 2008 Nominated, Best TV Program

US International Film and Video Festival
 2008 Winner, Certificate

Catholic Mass Media Awards
 2008 Winner, Best Children's Program
 2009 Winner, Best Children's Program

MTRCB TV Awards
 2009 Nominated, Best Children's Show

2007 Philippine television series debuts
2010 Philippine television series endings
Children's news shows
Filipino-language television shows
GMA Integrated News and Public Affairs shows
Philippine children's television series
Q (TV network) original programming